Altrad RMD Kwikform is a company based in Aldridge, England, that hires and sells temporary works and engineering design for building construction and infrastructure projects.

History
The company was formed as Mills Scaffold Company in 1935 and became GKN Kwikform on acquisition by GKN in 1983. It expanded rapidly in formwork and scaffolding under GKN ownership in the end of the 1980s. In June 2000, GKN Kwikform merged with RMD (Rapid Metal Developments, established in 1948), the formwork and scaffolding unit of RM Douglas (part of Tilbury Douglas), to form RMD Kwikform. Tilbury Douglas renamed itself Interserve in 2001.

Projects built using RMD Kwikform equipment included the New Tyne Tunnel, completed in February 2011. In 2015, RMD Kwikform launched its ground shoring range of products, extending its capabilities to ground works applications.

When parent company Interserve got into financial difficulties in December 2018, restructuring options included spinning off the £250m building materials unit RMD Kwikform to lenders, leaving the remainder of Interserve as a more focused support services business.

However, the Cabinet Office reportedly objected to any deal involving selling RMD Kwikform, believing this would render the remainder of the business almost worthless, making it difficult to continue awarding contracts to the company. At the beginning of 2019, Interserve announced agreement on a deleveraging deal which retained RMD Kwikform in the group, but the plan was rejected by shareholders at an AGM on 15 March 2019.

Interserve's board applied for the parent company to be placed into administration, and pursued a 'pre pack' deal, selling the group, including RMD Kwikform, to a new company, Interserve Group Ltd, controlled by Interserve's existing lenders.

In August 2019, Interserve appointed Ken Hanna as a non executive director of its board, and chairman of RMD Kwikform. RMD Kwikform had been the strongest performer in the group, but results in 2018 showed a 27% drop in operating profits to £39.6m, as turnover fell to £195.5m from £229m. In October 2021, RMD Kwikform was sold to France's Altrad group for over £140m.

References

External links
 RMD Kwikform Official site

Construction equipment rental companies of the United Kingdom
Business services companies of the United Kingdom
Business services companies established in 1948
1948 establishments in England